Atari is a video game and computer brand.

Atari may also refer to:

Companies 
 Atari, Inc. (1972–1984), the defunct original corporation co-founded by Nolan Bushnell and Ted Dabney
 Atari Corporation (1984–1996), the defunct corporation formed by Jack Tramiel from the original Atari Inc.'s Consumer Division assets
 Atari Games (1984–2003), the coin-operated game company spun off from the original Atari Inc.'s Coin-Op division
 Atari SA (2009–present), the former Infogrames Entertainment, SA, a French holding company who owns and runs the current Atari branded divisions
 Atari, Inc. (1993–present) (2003–present), the US division of Atari, SA
 Atari Interactive, the current holding company of the Atari brand and a division of Atari, SA

Places 
 Atari, Pakistan, a town in Pakistan.
 Atari, Ādaži Municipality, a village in Latvia
 Atari, Nawanshahr, a village in Punjab, India
 Atrai Upazila, Rajshahi, Bangladesh
 Attari, a village in Punjab, Indian near the border crossing with Pakistan
 Atari Shyam Singh railway station

Other uses 
 Atari (当たり), a Japanese word used in the game of Go
 Atari (Jakks Pacific), two plug-and-play video-game consoles featuring Atari games
 The Ataris, an alternative rock band
 Atari Teenage Riot, a punk/techno band
 Atari, abbreviation of Finnish registry term "ammatti- ja taparikollinen" ("professional and habitual criminal") used by Finnish police
Atari (name)
Atari Democrat a  political term used in the United States during the 80s and 90s
Atari 2600, sometimes simply just called Atari
 , an Islamic traditionalist theology

See also 
 Atrai River in India and Bangladesh
 Athari